Santa Maria Immacolata di Lourdes a Boccea is a 20th-century parochial church and titular church in Rome, dedicated to Our Lady of Lourdes.

History 

The church was built in 1958, the centenary of the first Lourdes apparitions, for the Suore dell'Immacolata Concezione di Nostra Signora di Lourdes (Sisters of the Immaculate Conception of Our Lady of Lourdes). The façade is characterized by a large concrete pseudotympanum, set on a central band in travertine, which contains the entrance portal and a rose window.

In 1985, it was made a titular church to be held by a cardinal-priest.

Titulars
Juan Francisco Fresno (1985–2004)
 Nicholas Cheong Jin-suk (2006–2021)
Richard Baawobr (2022)

References

External links

Titular churches
Rome Q. XIII Aurelio
Roman Catholic churches completed in 1958
20th-century Roman Catholic church buildings in Italy